Esporte Clube Internacional, usually known as Inter de Santa Maria, Internacional de Santa Maria, Inter-SM, is a Brazilian football club based in Santa Maria, Rio Grande do Sul. It currently plays in Campeonato Gaúcho Série A2, the second level of the Rio Grande do Sul state football league.

Founded on May 16, 1928. The club competed in the Campeonato Brasileiro Série A in 1982, finishing 21st. Inter plays its home matches in its own stadium, Estádio Presidente Vargas, which has a maximum capacity of 12,000 people and is also known as Baixada Melancólica.

Achievements

 Campeonato Gaúcho Second Level:
 Winners (2): 1968, 1991
 '''Campeonato Gaúcho Top Goalscorer: Badico (1998)

References

Association football clubs established in 1928
Football clubs in Rio Grande do Sul
1928 establishments in Brazil